is a JR West railway station in Matsue, Shimane, Japan. It is located on the San'in Main Line and Kisuki Line.

Layout
Shinji Station has one side platform and one island platform.

Platforms

Adjacent stations
West Japan Railway Company (JR West)

See also
List of railway stations in Japan

External links
 Shinji Station (JR West official page)

Railway stations in Japan opened in 1909
Railway stations in Shimane Prefecture